Navabi (adjective form of نواب (navāb) meaning "nabob", "nawab" – and thus roughly translating as "of Navab", "from a nabob (rich Mughal ruler)", "relating to a nabob") is a Persian surname. Notable people with the surname include:
 Armin Navabi (born 1983), Iranian-Canadian ex-Muslim atheist and secular activist, author and podcaster
 Hakan Massoud Navabi (born 1990), Afghan-Canadian freelance journalist, writer and entrepreneur
 Shirin Navabi (born 1980), Iranian female chess player

Fictional character 
 Samar Navabi, character from the American crime drama television series The Blacklist

See also 
 Navab
 Nowjeh Deh, Tabriz, also called Navabi, village in Tazeh Kand Rural District, Khosrowshahr District, Tabriz County, East Azerbaijan Province, Iran

References 

Persian-language surnames
Dari-language surnames